The 1994 Oregon State Beavers football team represented Oregon State University in the Pacific-10 Conference (Pac-10) during the 1994 NCAA Division I-A football season.  In their fourth season under head coach Jerry Pettibone, the Beavers compiled a 4–7 record (2–6 against Pac-10 opponents), finished in a tie for last place in the Pac-10, and were outscored by their opponents, 239 to 223.  The team played its home games at Parker Stadium in Corvallis, Oregon.

Schedule

Roster
QB Don Shanklin

References

Oregon State
Oregon State Beavers football seasons
Oregon State Beavers football